The 2016 Euro Winners Cup was the fourth edition of Euro Winners Cup, an annual continental beach soccer tournament for top European clubs, similar to that of the UEFA Champions League, held in Catania, Italy, from 23 – 29 May 2016. Russian team BSC Kristall are the defending champions.

Participating teams
A record 28 nations represented by an increased total of 32 clubs will participate in the tournament. Similarly to the UEFA Champions League, the higher quality leagues received more than one spot in the competition for their respective leagues' clubs to compete. The other leagues will be represented solely by their champions.

Note: The following teams pulled out:
 Bohemians 1905 
 Darsahan 
 Rehab 
 Kakhaber Mikeladze

They were replaced by:
 Lokomotiv Moscow
 Portsmouth
 Hemako Sztutowo
 Dinamo Batumi

Group stage
With an increase in the number of teams, eight groups of four teams will constitute the group stage, competing in a round-robin format. The group allocations were drawn on May 4.

Group A

Group B

Group C

Group D

Group E

Group F

Group G

Group H

Knock-out stage
The top two ranking teams from each group will proceed to the knock-out stage, beginning with the round of 16. Each round will consist of a one-off match.

See also
Mundialito de Clubes

References

External links
Euro Winners Cup 2016, beachsoccer.com

Euro Winners Cup
Euro
2016
Sport in Catania
2016 in beach soccer